Hans-Kristian Solberg Vittinghus (born 16 January 1986) is a Danish badminton player. He was a member of the winning Denmark team at the 2016 Thomas Cup in Kunshan, China.

Career

Junior 
He won 4 junior national titles, 2 in singles in 2003 and 2005 and 2 in men's doubles in 1999 and 2003.
As a part of the Danish Under 19 national team, he won the gold medal at the Under 19 European Team Championships. He also won a bronze medal in the individual event in men's singles.

Senior 
After becoming a senior player in the summer of 2005, he won his first international title in November 2006, beating former world no. 1, M. Roslin Hashim in the final of the Norwegian International Championships. Since then he has recaptured the title in Norway twice, in 2009 and 2010.

He also won the Turkiye International in 2007, Dutch International in 2008 & 2011, Spanish Open in 2009 and 2013, Irish International in 2010, Belgian International in 2014 and Denmark International in 2019.

He also plays in the Danish Badminton League. He plays as the first singles for Højbjerg Badminton. Hans-Kristian Vittinghus started playing badminton at the age of five in Solrød Strand Badmintonklub.

In November 2015, he won the Scottish Grand Prix in Glasgow, Scotland, against English Rajiv Ouseph as the no.1 seed, 21–19, 11–21, 21–16.

In June 2016, he beat Ihsan Maulana Mustofa of Indonesia to win the first Thomas Cup trophy for Denmark. He later won his first BWF Super Series title, the Australian Open Super Series, beating Jeon Hyeok-jin from Korea 21–16, 19–21, 21–11.

Personal life 
Vittinghus married Norwegian dressage rider Selina Hundstuen Solberg on 11 September 2016. They have one child together, named Vincent.

Vittinghus hosts his own podcast called A Year On Tour with Vittinghus, where he talks about his experience on tournaments and various BWF World Tour events he has participated in. He also co-hosts another podcast together with fellow Danish badminton player Anders Antonsen, called The Badminton Experience, where they cover many different topics on badminton, ranging from players and technical aspects of the game. They also host Q&A sessions from time to time,and sometimes, they invite other badminton players to come on the podcasts as guests, to share their experience and answer questions from the hosts. Notable players that have been on the podcast include Lee Zii Jia, Greysia Polli, Anthony Sinisuka Ginting and former Danish Men's singles player Peter Gade.

Achievements

European Championships 
Men's singles

European Junior Championships 
Boys' singles

BWF World Tour (1 runner-up) 
The BWF World Tour, which was announced on 19 March 2017 and implemented in 2018, is a series of elite badminton tournaments sanctioned by the Badminton World Federation (BWF). The BWF World Tours are divided into levels of World Tour Finals, Super 1000, Super 750, Super 500, Super 300 (part of the HSBC World Tour), and the BWF Tour Super 100.

Men's singles

BWF Superseries (1 title, 1 runner-up)
The BWF Superseries, which was launched on 14 December 2006 and implemented in 2007, was a series of elite badminton tournaments, sanctioned by the Badminton World Federation (BWF). BWF Superseries levels were Superseries and Superseries Premier. A season of Superseries consisted of twelve tournaments around the world that had been introduced since 2011. Successful players were invited to the Superseries Finals, which were held at the end of each year.

Men's singles

  BWF Superseries Finals tournament
  BWF Superseries Premier tournament
  BWF Superseries tournament

BWF Grand Prix (2 titles, 4 runners-up)
The BWF Grand Prix had two levels, the Grand Prix and Grand Prix Gold. It was a series of badminton tournaments sanctioned by the Badminton World Federation (BWF) and played between 2007 and 2017.

Men's singles

  BWF Grand Prix Gold tournament
  BWF Grand Prix tournament

BWF International Challenge/Series (11 titles, 1 runner-up)
Men's singles

  BWF International Challenge tournament
  BWF International Series tournament

References

External links 

 

1986 births
Living people
People from Frederikshavn
Danish male badminton players
Sportspeople from the North Jutland Region